The Bridge No. 63-137-90 is a historic bridge near Parker in rural Turner County, South Dakota.  It was built sometime between 1934 and 1936, and is one of a large number of surviving stone bridges built as part of federal jobs programs in the county.  It was listed on the National Register of Historic Places in 1999 as Bridge No. 63-137-090-Parker.

Description and history
Bridge No. 63-137-090 is located in north central Turner County, a rural county in eastern South Dakota. It has flared and sloping wing walls, which rise slightly above the road level to form low parapets.

This bridge is one of 65 stone bridges built in Turner County as part of a New Deal-era federal jobs program.  The county administration was able to build stone bridges at a lower cost than then-conventional steel beam bridges because of the availability of experienced stone workers, and the federal subsidy to the wages they were paid.  The county was responsible for supervising the work crews and providing the building materials.  This bridge was built by a county crew, sometime between 1934 and 1936 (records have not survived for an exact construction date).

See also
National Register of Historic Places listings in Turner County, South Dakota
List of bridges on the National Register of Historic Places in South Dakota

References

National Register of Historic Places in Turner County, South Dakota
Bridges on the National Register of Historic Places in South Dakota
Bridges completed in 1940
Transportation in Turner County, South Dakota
Buildings and structures in Turner County, South Dakota
Steel bridges in the United States
Stone arch bridges in the United States
Road bridges in South Dakota